Story of an Immigrant is the third and final studio album by South African alternative rock band Civil Twilight. It was released on 10 June 2015 through Wind-up Records. The album produced 3 singles: the title track "Story of an Immigrant", "Holy Dove" and "When, When".

Track listing

Personnel 
 Steven McKellar – lead vocals, bass guitar, piano
 Andrew McKellar – guitar, backing vocals
 Richard Wouters – drums
 Kevin Dailey    – guitar

References 

Civil Twilight (band) albums
2015 albums
Albums produced by Ben H. Allen